Dhaboolaq is a town in the Maroodi Jeex region of Somaliland

See also
Administrative divisions of Somaliland
Regions of Somaliland
Districts of Somaliland

References
Dhaboolaq, Somalia

Populated places in Maroodi Jeex